Kiyevsky is a rural locality (a khutor) in Profsoyuzninskoye Rural Settlement, Danilovsky District, Volgograd Oblast, Russia. The population was 2 as of 2010. There is 1 street.

Geography 
The village is located in steppe, on the north-west bank of the Bobrovoye Lake, 9.4 km from Profsoyuznik, 40 km from Danilovka and 260 km from Volgograd.

References 

Rural localities in Danilovsky District, Volgograd Oblast